Bagh Darrehsi (also Romanized as Bāgh Darrehsī and Bāghdarrehsī) is a village in Garmeh-ye Jonubi Rural District, in the Central District of Meyaneh County, East Azerbaijan Province, Iran. At the 2006 census, its population was 47, in 10 families.

References 

Populated places in Meyaneh County